This is a list of cartoons shows based on video games. It does not include Japanese anime series, which are listed separately on the List of anime based on video games, but everything could be listed on the List of television series based on video games.

Animated Series

Ended

Current

Upcoming

See also
List of anime based on video games
List of films based on video games

References

 
Lists of works based on video games
Video games